Association football is a developed sport in the Philippines, played by Filipino football clubs. The Philippine Football Federation (PFF) is the governing body of international football in the country.

Football is a popular sport in the Philippines, although basketball has been the most popular historically. However, football has a long history in the archipelago, dating back to more than 100 years ago when Paulino Alcántara Riestra became the first Filipino and Asian player to play for a European club.  He made his debut as a striker at the age of 15 at Barcelona, which made him the club's youngest and second highest goalscorer behind Lionel Messi. Since then, the first football teams began to form, including the Manila Sporting Club in 1906, the Sandow Athletic Club in 1909, and the Bohemian Sporting Club in 1910.

To promote and revive the sport, some international and local football clubs helped the Philippines. FIFA also assisted the country by building and upgrading facilities including the creation of the PFF headquarters in 2009. As well, the establishment of the United Football League (UFL) and the National Men's Club Championship to provide more local competitions.

The Philippines national football team is the representative of men's international football for the Philippines. They won the Far Eastern Games once (in 1913) and became a two-time Philippine Peace Cup champion (in 2012 and 2013). The Philippines women's national football team, representing women's international football in the Philippines, achieved a third-place (bronze) finish at the 1985 Southeast Asian Games.

There are many stadiums that can be found in the Philippines, like the Rizal Memorial Stadium in Manila, which is the national stadium of the country. It is also the home stadium of the Philippine football team. Meanwhile, the Panaad Stadium in Bacolod is the secondary venue for the Philippines.

History

Introduction

Around 1895, football was introduced in the Philippines by English sportsmen.  In addition, some Filipinos sent to college in Hong Kong and China returned home and taught their friends a little bit about the game of football.  Within a year, there were two or three football clubs established in Manila. In 1898, the U.S. Navy battleship Maine was anchored in Havana harbor to protect the Americans from a riot between Cuba and Spanish officers, and after the ship sank resulting in significant casualties, the Americans declared war against Spain, beginning the Spanish–American War. They damaged every ship in Manila Bay. This ended Spanish colonization of the Philippines, and replaced the colonizing Spaniards with Americans. When the war broke out, those football teams disbanded and abandoned the city, either to save themselves and their families from the bombardment they expected at any moment, or to cast their lot with the Filipino troops outside the city limits. After the war when peace reigned again, six football teams were formed, among them the Manila Sporting Club, the Paris Club, and the Manila Jockey Club. In 1906, the Sandow football team was established (further developed as Sandow Athletic Club in 1909).

On 15 October 1907, the first official football match was held in Manila, with the celebration of the opening of the Philippine Assembly. The trophy, a silver cup donated by 27th President of the United States William Howard Taft, was won by the Sandow Athletic Club.  Soon, more clubs were formed.  In 1910, the Bohemian Sporting Club was organized and began to train football players. In 1920, the Circulo Social Deportivo was established and produced a football team. To further propagate the love of the sport and to regulate soccer championship contests, all football teams within the city banded themselves together and organized the Philippine Amateur Football Association in 1907 (now the Philippine Football Federation), and held its first championship in 1921 with Bohemian Sporting Club as champions.

On 25 February 1912, Paulino Alcántara was the first Filipino and Asian footballer to play for a European club. Alcántara made his debut for Barcelona at the age of 15 against Català Sporting Club, where he scored his first hat-trick. Alcántara remains the youngest player to play or score for the club. He scored 369 goals in 357 matches, making him the second club's highest goalscorer (counting goals scored in both official games and friendlies) with Lionel Messi ranking first in the record. In 1917, he was selected by the Philippines to represent the country at the Far Eastern Championship Games in Tokyo, helping them defeat Japan 15–2, which remains the largest win in Philippine international football history. Alcántara only played once for the Philippines that finished second in the tournament. He also made some appearances in other national teams, including Catalonia and Spain. In 1916, while continuing his studies in medicine, he played football for a local team, the Bohemian Sporting Club, whom he helped win two Philippine Championships in 1917 and 1918.

The popularity of "The Beautiful Game" did not even decrease when the Americans founded basketball in the Philippines in 1910 as part of the physical education curriculum in Philippine schools. Two surveys were conducted in parts of Metro Manila in 2012—the first found that basketball is the most-watched sport at 74.4%, and football is fourth at 17.9%. In the second survey, basketball was found to be the most-played sport during leisure time at 9.6%, while association football did not make the list.

1950s-1970s
Football saw some rise in the fifties where the country saw enthusiasm for the sport built through the football teams of top educational institutions such as the Ateneo, Letran, La Salle, San Beda, San Carlos, UST, Silliman, and the University of Visayas.

The Philippine Football Association partnered with San Miguel Brewery to seek foreign assistance in developing football in the country. In the early sixties, British coaches Alan Rogers and Brian Birch were brought in and funded by San Miguel to train referees, coaches and players in the country. Due to lack of facilities, the two coaches organized a five-a-side football competition which was played in a field with the same size of a basketball court. The two were later relieved and Danny McClellan and Graham Adams were tasked train national and youth players.

San Miguel through the Philippine Football Association, brought in Spanish medical students who were knowledgeable in football in 1961. Association president, Felipe Monserrat, tasked the Spaniards to garner interest in football in the country and to train local players. The composition of the Spanish quarter were: Francisco Escarte, Enrique dela Mata, Claudio Sanchez, and Juan Cutillas, with the former two leaving after a year. The group was then followed by, Peter Leaver from the United Kingdom who focused on developing school football and assisted schools such as Ateneo and La Salle. Philippine football also received promotional support from the Elizalde Company.

In 1971 Juan Cutillas, selected four Spanish players and one Chinese in an effort to boost the Philippine national team. The national team joined the tournaments such as the Pestabola Merdeka, Pesta Sukan, Jakarta Anniversary Tournament, and the President Park Tournament. The Philippines managed to cause upsets results against Thailand, Singapore, and South Korea. When the Spanish players, Tomas Lozano, Mannuel Cuenca, Juan Guitierrez, and Julio Roxas left the football team due to financial reasons, football in the country saw another decline and basketball gained foothold in the country.

Revival

Help from foreign countries and clubs
There have been four projects accepted by the Fédération Internationale de Football Association (FIFA), to build and upgrade football facilities in the Philippines. In the first project, approved in August 2000, FIFA built six technical centers on Iloilo, Laguna, Negros Occidental, Cagayan de Oro, Zamboanga, and Agusan del Sur, with a total budget of ₱  (≈€  or ≈$ ).  The next project, in December 2006, constructed the headquarters of the PFF in Pasig. Its third project was to upgrade the pitch in the Rizal Memorial Stadium to an artificial turf from August to September 2012, but it was discontinued because Philippine Football Federation President Mariano Araneta said that conducting the 2012 Philippine Peace Cup in Manila would lessen the expenses of the PFF in the event. FIFA's final project was to build a technical center in Bukidnon, which includes a natural grass pitch, dormitories, changing rooms, lecture rooms and offices.

A number of foreign countries and clubs have offered to help promote and popularise the sport within the country. In 2010, the German Football Association (DFB) recommended the services of former Rwanda U-17 coach Michael Weiß as coach of the "Azkals", a nickname for the national team, after Dan Palami's three-day visit in Frankfurt. The DFB gave the Philippine Football Federation a grant of €  (≈₱ 31 million or ≈$ ). However, after three years as a head coach, Weiß was no longer part of the Azkals after the PFF's year-end evaluation.

On 18 October 2011, officials from the Real Madrid Foundation visited the Philippines to sign an agreement with local non-governmental organizations (NGO) to open a social and sports academy for youths in Mindanao to 70 poor children with under age 14. On 15 May 2012, English club Chelsea was joined by international development manager Ian Woodroffe, and Adrian New, managing director for Asia, arrived in the country to formally launch a football school at the SM Mall of Asia. It is the third football school created by Chelsea in Asia, after two others in Hong Kong and Kuala Lumpur. The school is operated by Phil Younghusband and James Younghusband, brothers and former members of Chelsea's Reserves and Youth Team. After a year, Smart Communications sponsored the soccer school through its partnership with the Younghusband Football Academy (TYFA) to visit schools throughout the Philippines in conjunction with Smart's program. Soon after its establishment, they built an artificial grass football field named as Gatorade-Chelsea Blue Pitch in Ayala Alabang. The opening ceremonies was joined with Ayala Corporation president, Fernando Zobel de Ayala, Makati mayor Jun Binay and Makati representative Monique Lagdameo last 15 January 2014.

Another Spanish club, Barcelona, conducted a camp in Muntinlupa named "Barcelona Escola Camp 2013". It began on 17 April and ended on 21 April 2013. Two coaches from Barcelona Escola, Joseph Moratalla and Jordi Blanco, came to the Philippines. The camp was organized by Team Socceroo. A second camp was scheduled on 18 to 22 December 2013, held in Emperador Stadium, Taguig.  Coaches from the camp shared their training, philosophy, methodology, and values with the children.

After the destruction of Typhoon Haiyan in the country, FIFA gave the PFF $ 1 million to rebuild and rehabilitate damaged football facilities. Leyte Football Association President Dan Palami and other football officials are planning to construct a training center in Tacloban from the grant FIFA gave.

On 3 December 2011, the Philippines faced U.S. club LA Galaxy as a part of their Asia-Pacific Tour in the Rizal Memorial Stadium, which Galaxy won 6–1.

Manchester United with its sponsor, a shampoo brand Clear made a "multi-year partnership" as they will hold training camps facilitated by coaches in the sport. The Manchester United Soccer School will teach 32 amateur footballers in an "intense and rigorous" program. Tryouts were held in March 2014.

Development of international and local competitions

In 2008, the Filipino Premier League (FPL) was established as the top-flight competition in the Philippines. It featured eight clubs from the National Capital Region. The PFF also planned a Visayas and Mindanao FPL tournament in 2009, which never materialized. The first and only champion of the league, which was cancelled at the season's conclusion, was the Philippine Army.

Shortly after the dissolution of the Filipino Premier League, the Football Alliance sought to renew the interest of Filipinos in football. The Alliance entered into discussions with the United Football Clubs Association for the possibility of establishing another top-flight football competition in the Philippines. Instead of creating a whole system and competition, the United Football Clubs Association agreed to partner with the Football Alliance in operating the United Football League (UFL), a semi-professional league. After the league's second season, AKTV became its official TV broadcaster with the signing of a ₱ 150 million (~$3.3 million or ~€2.5 million), five-year deal, which ensures the airing of two live matches every week. The deal was further improved with a new TV arrangement in which four live matches would be aired every week on primetime television on AksyonTV.

On 21 April 2017, the Philippines Football League (PFL) was launched as the first professional football league and the highest level of men's club football in the country. The league is sanctioned by the Philippine Football Federation, and replaced the United Football League which was previously the de facto top-tier league. Unlike the UFL, teams joining the PFL will be representing cities and provinces, as well as, have their own certified home stadiums and youth teams. Six of the eight teams joining the inaugural season came from the UFL, namely Ceres–Negros, Global Cebu, JPV Marikina, Kaya FC–Makati, Loyola Meralco Sparks, and Stallion Laguna. Two new teams Davao Aguilas, and Ilocos United were formed to join the new league.

The Philippine Football Federation has not been able to organize a national tournament since 2007, when they staged the PFF Centennial Men's Open Championship due to "variety of reasons". In January 2011, Smart Communications approached the PFF with an offer to finance a new local football cup competition, the PFF National Men's Club Championship. The proposed partnership was set to last 10 years, with Smart releasing ₱ 80 million in funds with the aim of providing more playing opportunities for football players, and the eventual creation of a national cup. In March 2011, the first season of the cup began.

Since 2012, the Chinese Taipei Football Association (CTFA) requested if the PFF can host the third staging of the Long Teng Cup in the Philippines. It was then accepted, the Philippines which has been a regular participant since its inception in 2010, renamed the tournament the Paulino Alcántara Cup, then renamed it once again to the Paulino Alcántara Peace Cup.  The tournament was eventually renamed the Philippine Peace Cup because the Philippine Sports Commission, which operates the Rizal Memorial Stadium where the tournament was held, has a rule against events named after an individual. The tournament takes place in September to celebrate Peace Month in the Philippines.

National team performance

The inaugural season of the Far Eastern Games (FEG) in 1913 was the first championship held in Manila.  The tournament provided the first matches in international football for all three nations, including the Republic of China and Japan. In the same season, the Philippines clinched their first championship title in international soccer when they defeated China 2–1. They also competed in 1915 in Shanghai, where the Chinese grabbed their first FEG title against the Filipinos. The Philippine team has competed in every Far Eastern Games, but has not yet won another tournament since 1913. In 1938, the FEG was cancelled due to the outbreak of the Second Sino-Japanese War.

The Philippine team competed in the Asian Games numerous times, making their debut in 1954 when the Philippines hosted the tournament.  The Filipinos were in Group A with South Vietnam and Chinese Taipei.  All games was held in Rizal Memorial Stadium.  Their matches were both losses, resulting in early elimination. They returned in 1958 in Tokyo, this time competing in Group C.  The Azkals recorded their first win at the games over Japan, but eventually lost to Hong Kong. In 1962, the Asian Games were held in Jakarta. Chinese Taipei and Israel were excluded in the tournament when the Indonesian government refused to issue visas for the Israeli and Taiwanese delegations.  Meanwhile, Burma withdrew from competition. The Philippine team finished last in the standings, behind South Vietnam, Indonesia, and Malaya. The team finished last again in 1974 after losing every game. Beginning in 2002, an age division of under-23 was approved for men, which is the same as in football competitions in the Olympic Games.  The Philippines U-23 has never yet made an appearance at the Asian Games since 2002.

The Philippine team has participated in minor tournaments such as the Merdeka Tournament in 1962, 1971 and 1972, where each was finished in the group stages.

The Philippines have qualified for the AFC Asian Cup for the first time in 2019. They have also played at the AFC Challenge Cup, which formerly served as a qualifier for the Asian Cup prior to 2019. They have made three appearances; in 2006, 2012, and 2014. The 2006 AFC Challenge Cup was the opening season of the competition, held in Bangladesh. The Philippines advanced automatically because there was no qualification stages. After competing in Group A, they concluded the standings with a loss over Chinese Taipei and two draws with India and Afghanistan. However, in the second season, they did not advance because of their performance at the qualification phase, finishing short at second place only by goal difference. Their first match was a victory over Brunei, followed by a goalless draw from Tajikistan and a 3–0 win against Bhutan. The conclusion was the same in the 2010 qualification stage, where they ended their campaign by finishing third.

The Philippine national team's campaign at the 2010 AFF Championship under head coach Simon McMenemy was seen as a success and played an important role in football in the country. The national team along with Laos had to qualify for the tournament. The Philippines advanced from the group stage for the first time in the history of the tournament. They did not concede a single defeat and their win against defending champions Vietnam in the group stage in particular was considered as one of the biggest upsets in the history of the tournament. The match, which would later be referred by local Filipino fans as the "Miracle of Hanoi", is also considered as the match that started a football renaissance in the country where basketball is the more popular sport. In the knockout stage, they had to play both their designated home and away games against Indonesia in Jakarta due to the unavailability of a stadium that passes AFF standards. The Philippines lost both games to end their campaign.

The following year, the Michael Weiß became the Philippines head coach. The Philippines has not made an appearance in the World Cup.  However, the national team managed to qualify for the 2012 edition of the AFC Challenge Cup, the first time since qualifiers were introduced and also recorded their first ever victory in the FIFA World Cup qualification, beating Sri Lanka 4–0 in the second leg of the first preliminary round. Kuwait finished the Philippines' World Cup qualification campaign after winning over them twice in the second round.

The Filipinos grabbed their best finish in the cup when they were ranked third in the 2012 edition, with a loss from Turkmenistan in the semi-finals, and a victory against Palestine in the third place playoff.

In the national team's 2013 season, they capped off the year by finishing 127th in the FIFA World Rankings as their new all-time high.

The Philippines won two minor competitions, both in the Philippine Peace Cup. Since winning the 2012 Peace Cup, for the first time in 99 years, the national team earned their first international title after winning all of their games. Also in 2013, they retained the title after a win over Pakistan.

In late 2016 the Philippines jointly hosted the group stage of the 2016 AFF Championship with Myanmar though they fail to progress from the group stage like they did in the past three editions.

Though the national team failed to qualify for the 2018 FIFA World Cup in Russia, they secured qualification for 2019 AFC Asian Cup after defeating Tajikistan, 2–1 at home in their final qualifier match.

League system

Men's league

The premier men's football league in the country is the Philippines Football League, which replaced the previous United Football League in late 2016. It officially launched on April 21, 2017 at the Shangri-La at the Fort in Taguig.

Competition format
The PFL followed a traditional home-and-away double round-robin format from the 2018 to 2019 seasons, although some clubs did not have their home stadiums at the time.

Since the 2020 season, all matches are held in a bio-secure bubble in a single venue due to the COVID-19 pandemic in the Philippines. Succeeding seasons will be held in a centralized venue with long-term plans to include reverting to a home-and-away format.

In the inaugural season of 2017, the league had two phases, the regular season, which adopted a home-and-away, double round-robin format, and the "Finals Series", a play-off round where the top four teams of the regular season played each other to determine the champions of the league. The Finals Series was not held for the succeeding seasons.

The league only had one division since its existence, but there are plans to introduce a second division as the league expands, with a system of promotion and relegation within the PFL to be put in place. There was a proposal to convert the former UFL to a second division tournament or a reserve league to the PFL.

The Copa Paulino Alcantara is the cup tournament of the PFL since the 2018 season.

Qualification for Asian competitions
The Champions of the PFL automatically qualify to compete in the group stages of the AFC Champions League. Meanwhile, the winners of the Copa Paulino Alcantara automatically qualify to compete in the group stages of the AFC Cup, though they also qualify for the preliminary round of the AFC Champions League play-offs.

History of Asian qualification
AFC Champions League
2017–2020: The league's champions qualify for the preliminary round of the play-offs, and they have to renounce to their slot in the AFC Cup in case of advancement to the group stage.
From 2021: The league's champions qualify directly for the group stage of the tournament; the winners of the Copa Paulino Alcantara (or the league's second placers, only for the 2020 season) qualify for the preliminary round of the play-offs, and they have to renounce to their slot in the AFC Cup in case of advancement to the group stage.
AFC Cup
2017: The league's second placers qualify directly for the group stage of the tournament, with third placers eligible to replace them whether they were unable to play in the competition; if the league's champions failed to advance to the group stage of the AFC Champions League, they would still benefit from a free slot in the tournament.
2018–2020: The winners of the Copa Paulino Alcantara qualify directly for the group stage of the tournament; if the league's champions failed to advance to the group stage of AFC Champions League, they would still benefit from a free slot in the tournament.
From 2021: The winners of the Copa Paulino Alcantara (or the league's second placers, only for the 2020 season) qualify directly for the group stage of the tournament.

Women's league

Likewise, the premier women's football league in the country is the PFF Women's League, which was launched on November 5, 2016 by the Philippine Football Federation, to follow up with the PFF Women's Cup that was launched in 2014.  (PFF). The competition became the first to follow a league format following the folding of the Pinay Futbol League in 2013 and became the first women's domestic league in the country. The league sanctioned by PFF as an amateur league as part of FIFA's Women's Development Project for the Philippines.

National football teams

Men's teams
The Philippine national men's football team represents the Philippines in men's international football. The national team is referred to as the "Azkals" ― a word that is similar to Filipino term Askal meaning street dog. In addition, there are other youth national teams that represent the country in other competitions such as the Philippines national under-23 football team, also known as the Philippine Olympic team, the Philippines national under-19 football team, and the Philippines national under-17 football team. The Philippines national futsal team represents men's international futsal, and the Philippines national beach soccer team in men's international beach soccer.

Women's teams
The women's team, also known as the "Malditas", represents the country in women's international football and is eligible to qualify for the Olympics. The Malditas captured a third-place (bronze) finish in the 1985 Southeast Asian Games and has competed in the AFC Women's Asian Cup. The women's team also has qualified for the FIFA Women's World Cup (first in 2023) while the men's team and the youth teams has yet to qualify for their equivalent world cup tournaments.

Stadiums

The Rizal Memorial Stadium in Manila is the national stadium of the Philippines, as well as the home venue of the national team. It has served as the main stadium of the 1954 Asian Games and a former venue for the United Football League.  Established in 1934, the stadium has a capacity of 12,873. Another stadium, Panaad Stadium in Bacolod, is an alternative home stadium for the Philippines with 20,000 seats.

The Emperador Stadium in Taguig, the main stadium of the UFL, has an all-weather football pitch made of artificial turf, developed by real estate developer Megaworld Corporation and constructed by All Asia Structures, Inc. The University of Makati Stadium, another former UFL venue, is the first football stadium built by a local university, and has a capacity of 4,000. Iloilo Sports Complex is the host of home matches from Iloilo F.A. It hosted an international competition in the group stages of the 2013 AFC President's Cup.

In 2014, the Philippine Sports Stadium was opened in Bulacan, which is also the largest stadium in term of capacity in the Philippines.

Notes

References
General
 
Footnotes

See also

 Sports in the Philippines

External links
 Philippine Football Federation
 Philippines Football League

 
Sports in the Philippines